Verran is a municipality in Nord-Trøndelag county, Norway.

Verran may also refer to:

Verran Sparebank, defunct Norwegian savings bank
Verran, South Australia, a locality in the District Council of Cleve

People
Harry Verran (1930–2015), Canadian politician
Helen Verran, Australian historian of science and academic
John Stanley Verran (1883–1952), Australian politician
John Verran (1856–1932), Australian politician and trade unionist
Verran Tucker (born 1988), American footballer